William E. Chase III is a United States Navy rear admiral who serves as the deputy commander of the Joint Force Headquarters-Department of Defense Information Network since July 12, 2021. He most recently served as the Senior Military Advisor for Cyber Policy to the Under Secretary of Defense for Policy and the Deputy Principal Cyber Advisor to the United States Secretary of Defense from October 12, 2020 to July 2021. Previously, he was the Deputy Director of Command, Control, Communications, and Computers/Cyber of the Joint Staff from July 2018 to October 2020.

References

External links

1968 births
Living people
Place of birth missing (living people)
United States Naval Academy alumni
Naval Postgraduate School alumni
National War College alumni
United States Navy admirals